Jurix was an early Linux distribution created by Florian La Roche, a former employee of the legal department at Saarland University. The distribution was maintained between 1993 and 1999 and hosted on the now-defunct "jurix.jura.uni-sb.de" and "susix.jura.uni-sb.de" domains.

In 1996, jurix superseded Slackware as a base for SuSE Linux.

The name "jurix" was borrowed from the department's first HTTP server, named by Alexander Sigel. It is not known whether the name was taken from the nearby Dutch law and IT organisation JURIX, or simply a portmanteau of "Jura" (meaning "law" in German) and "Unix".

A readme from 1999 touts the following software, among others:
modularized kernel 2.0.37 and 2.2.10
libc 5.4.46
egcs 1.1.2
ncurses 4.2-980822
shadow passwords
XFree86 3.3.3.1
KDE 1.1.1

References

External links
 

Discontinued Linux distributions
Linux distributions